The Mayor of Şymkent (Kazakh: әкім, äkım) is the chief authority in the city of Şymkent, Kazakhstan. The position was established in 1992.

List

Äkıms of Şymkent (1992–present)

See also 
 Akim

References 

Shymkent